Birdsey Renshaw (October 10, 1911, Middletown, Connecticut – November 23, 1948, Portland, Oregon) was an American electrophysiologist and neuroscientist. He is known for his 1941 discovery of the eponymous Renshaw cells and the Renshaw inhibition (recurrent inhibition), which is a negative feedback mechanism associated with the Renshaw cell action.

Biography
In 1936 he graduated with an M.D. from Harvard Medical School and then joined Alexander Forbes's neurophysiological research team in Harvard Medical School's physiology department. There he learned how to record cerebral action potentials using amplifiers and cathode-ray tubes. He developed microelectrodes from ultra-clean Pyrex pipettes and applied the microelectrodes to make extracellular recordings of action potentials found in the mammalian hippocampus and cortex. In 1938 he received his Ph.D. with thesis The Electrical Potentials Recorded in the Brain with Microelectrodes.

In 1938, after receiving his Ph.D.. he joined Herbert Spencer Gasser's group at the Rockefeller Institute for Medical Research (now named Rockefeller University). The research group included David Lloyd (1911–1985), Rafael Lorente de Nó, and Harry Grundfest.

In 1948 Renshaw died of polio within three days of the onset of symptoms.

In 1954 Eccles, Fatt, and Koketsu used intracellular recording to confirm Renshaw's findings and introduced the term "Renshaw cell".

Family
Birdsey Renshaw's mother was Laura Birdsey Renshaw (1878–1930) and his father was Raemer Rex Renshaw (1880–1938), a professor of organic chemistry at New York University and, during WW I, a U.S. Army captain in the Chemical Warfare Service. Late on the night of September 23, 1938, Professor Raemer Rex Renshaw and his second wife died after falling nineteen stories from their Tudor City apartment at 45 Prospect Place in Manhattan.

In August 1939 in Holyoke, Massachusetts, Birdsey Renshaw married Janet Card Hayes, who graduated from Mount Holyoke College. She had two brothers and two sisters. The younger of her two brothers was Samuel Perkins Hayes Jr. (1910–2002), who was a social psychologist, a consultant to the Peace Corps from 1961 to 1969, and president of the Foreign Policy Association until 1975. Birdsey and Janet Renshaw had two sons, Thomas Hayes Renshaw and Bruce Birdsey Renshaw.

Selected publications

References

External links
 

1911 births
1948 deaths
American neuroscientists
American physiologists
Electrophysiologists
Neurophysiologists
Harvard Medical School alumni
Rockefeller University people
People from Middletown, Connecticut